This is a list of companies either based or with large operation divisions in the Jacksonville/Northeast Florida area of the United States.

Active companies headquartered in the region

Other locally based companies

Save Rite
Stellar Group

Nonprofit companies headquartered in the region

US headquarters of foreign corporations

Divisions of US corporations

Defunct corporations

Divisions of foreign corporations
 BAE Systems Southeast Shipyards - Jacksonville - div. of BAE Systems

Corporations that moved to a different region
 St. Joe Company - moved to Watersound, Florida
 Burger King - moved to Miami, Florida

Economic overview
Harbor improvements since the late 19th century have made Jacksonville a major military and civilian deep-water port. Its riverine location facilitates two U.S. Navy bases and the Port of Jacksonville, Florida's third largest seaport.

Interstate Highways 10 and 95 intersect in Jacksonville, creating the busiest intersection in the region with 200,000 vehicles each day. Interstate 10 ends at this intersection (the other end being in Santa Monica, California).

Three significant freight railroads call Jacksonville home, and there are four public airports available: Jacksonville International Airport, Jacksonville Executive at Craig Airport, Herlong Recreational Airport and Cecil Airport at Cecil Commerce Center.

To emphasize the city's transportation capabilities, the Jacksonville Regional Chamber of Commerce filed "Jacksonville America's Logistics Center" as a trademark on November 9, 2007. It was formally registered on August 4, 2009. Cornerstone began promoting the city as "Jacksonville: America's Logistics Center" in 2009. Signs were added to the existing city limit markers on Interstate 95.

Significant factors in the local economy include services such as banking, insurance, and healthcare.

As with much of Florida, tourism is also important to the Jacksonville area, particularly tourism related to golf.

Strong presence in Jacksonville

The following notable businesses and organizations can be found in the Jacksonville, Florida area. Companies in bold with an asterisk (*) indicates a major employer in excess of 2,000 employees:

Amazon
Amtrak*
Anheuser-Busch
AT&T*
Bank of America*
BJ's Wholesale Club*
Buffet Crampon
CB Richard Ellis
CIT Group*
Citibank*
Convergys*
Deutsche Bank*
Fleet Readiness Center Southeast (FRCSE)
Gerdau Long Steel North America
JM Family Enterprises Inc.
Maxwell House Coffee
Mayo Clinic*
Moducomm Construction
Norfolk Southern Railway
Northrop Grumman
Publix*
Southeast Toyota Distributors
State of Florida*
Swisher International Group
United Parcel Service*
United States Postal Service*
The Viaggio Academy of Music
Wal-Mart*
Webster University
Wells Fargo*

References

External links
Jacksonville Business Exchange
Jacksonville Chamber of Commerce
Jacksonville Economic Development Commission

Economy of Jacksonville, Florida
Jacksonville Area
Jacksonville, Florida-related lists